A supply-chain network (SCN) is an evolution of the basic supply chain. Due to rapid technological advancement, organizations with a basic supply chain can develop this chain into a more complex structure involving a higher level of interdependence and connectivity between more organizations, this constitutes a supply-chain network.

A supply-chain network can be used to highlight interactions between organizations as well as to show the flow of information and materials across organizations. Supply-chain networks are now more global than ever and are typically structured with five key areas: external suppliers, production centers, distribution centers (DCs), demand zones, and transportation assets.

Overview

All organizations can purchase the components to build a supply-chain network, it is the collection of physical locations, transportation vehicles and supporting systems through which the products and services firm markets are managed and ultimately delivered.

Physical locations included in a supply-chain network can be manufacturing plants, storage warehouses, carrier cross-docks, major distribution centers, ports, intermodal terminals whether owned by a company, suppliers, a transport carrier, a third-party logistics provider, a retail store or an end customer. Transportation modes that operate within a supply-chain network can include the many different types of trucks, trains for boxcar or intermodal unit movement, container ships or cargo planes.

There are many systems which can be utilized to manage and improve a supply-chain network include Order Management Systems, Warehouse Management System, Transportation Management Systems, Strategic Logistics Modelling, Inventory Management Systems, Replenishment Systems, Supply Chain Visibility, Optimization Tools and more. Emerging technologies and standards such as the RFID and the GS1 Global Standards are now making it possible to automate these Supply Chain Networks in a real time manner making them more efficient than the simple supply chain of the past.

Supply-Chain Network Design 

A supply-chain network can be strategically designed in such a way as to reduce the cost of the supply chain; it has been suggested by experts that 80% of supply chain costs are determined by location of facilities and the flow of product between the facilities.  Supply chain network design is sometimes referred to as 'Network Modelling', due to the fact a mathematical model can be created to optimize the supply-chain network.

Companies have been led to modify their basic supply chain, investing in the tools and resources to develop an improved SCN design that takes into account taxation regulations, new entrants into their industry and availability of resources, has resulted in more complex network designs.

Designing a SCN involves creating a network that incorporates all the facilities, means of production, products, and transportation assets owned by the organization or those not owned by the organization but which immediately support the supply-chain operations and product flow. The design should also include details of the number and location of facilities: plants, warehouses, and supplier base. Therefore, it can be said that a SCN design is the combination of nodes with capability and capacity, connected by lanes to help products move between facilities As accessibility to data continues to improve, it is becoming increasingly important for organizations to make data-driven supply chain network design decisions regarding transportation procurement, based on accurate freight data. 

There is no definitive way to design a SCN as the network footprint, the capability and capacity, and product flow—all intertwine and are interdependent. Following on from this, there is also no single optimal SCN design, in designing the network there is an apparent trade-off between responsiveness, risk tolerance and efficiency.

Despite the network design inefficacies for a standard model, modern technologists cite the advantages of a connected ecosystem. An intertwined network of shippers, carriers, operators, brokers, and all incumbent entities within the supply-demand continuum. Donned as a freight platform, it acts as an online marketplace for loads and hauls. Shippers and carriers connect to haul freight and benefit from the latest tech innovations that proffer value-added services to the platform users. Real-time visibility, ETA, live status updates - with freight ecosystems, shippers are poised to be close with their orders, and carriers assume greater asset control.

Reverse Supply-Chain Network Design 

A new requirement for 'reverse supply-chain network design' has arisen from the environmental impact of end-of-life goods. This particular network design addresses logistical issues such as collection, processing and recycling of end-of-life goods. Companies that design both forward and reverse supply-chain processes together, with recycling & disposal in mind, have been noted to have the greatest success. Through this, organizations can support goods from production to disposal creating a 'closed-loop system'.

Examples of reverse supply network design 

Bosch is a company that capitalizes on this closed-loop system by building sensors into their power tool motor. Bosch can quickly assess the state of a motor reducing the cost of inspection and disposal, thereby increasing their profit margin on refurbished power tools.

Supply-Chain-Network Risk Analysis 

Though designing a supply-chain network can cut costs within a company, it is important to note the supply chain is not static but rather a continually improving model and adapt in response.  A key part of designing the supply-chain network is ensuring the network is versatile enough to cope with future uncertainties. Though there is inherent uncertainty about the future, a supply chain network risk analysis can be conducted; by using information available, the future business environment can be characterized.

The uncertainties associated with supply-chain networks fall within two categories, Endogenous uncertainty and Exogenous uncertainty.

Endogenous uncertainty 
An uncertainty can be categorized as 'endogenous' when the origin of the risk is within the supply-chain network itself, such as market volatility or technological turbulence.

Exogenous uncertainty 
An uncertainty can be categorized as 'exogenous' when the origin of the risk is external to the supply-chain network. Exogenous uncertainties can be further categorized; ongoing risks such as economic volatility, can be described as a 'continuous risk'. 'Discrete' events refer to infrequent events that could disrupt the supply-chain process, such as natural disasters.

Risk management 
By distinguishing between these types of uncertainty, an organization can decide the best approach to risk management. A company has a very limited ability to prevent exogenous uncertainty. The risk to the supply-chain network can be minimized by being well prepared for potential events. Endogenous uncertainty can be somewhat mitigated with precautions such as regular communication between an organization and supplier.

See also 
Document automation in supply-chain management & logistics.

External links

Building a Flexible Supply Chain Network from SC Digest
End to End SCN Pilot Benefits from SCN

References

Supply chain management
Radio-frequency identification

de:Supply-Chain-Management
es:Cadena de suministro